In molecular biology, small Cajal body specific RNA 4 (also known as ACA26) is believed to be a guide RNA of the H/ACA box class, since it has the predicted hairpin-hinge-hairpin-tail structure, conserved H/ACA-box motifs, and is found associated with GAR1. In particular, ACA26 is predicted to guide the pseudouridylation of residues U39 and U41 in U2 snRNA.  Such scaRNAs are a specific class of small nuclear RNAs that localise to the Cajal bodies and guide the modification of RNA polymerase II transcribed spliceosomal RNAs U1, U2, U4, U5 and U12.

References

Further reading

External links 
 

Small nuclear RNA